Kerry Gammill (born April 26, 1954) is an American artist who has worked in the fields of comic books, special effects, storyboards, and character designs. As a comic book artist, he is best known for his work on Power Man and Iron Fist for Marvel Comics and Superman for DC Comics.

Early life
Gammill grew up as a fan of the comics of the 1960s and 1970s, particularly the work of Jack Kirby, Steve Ditko, John Buscema, Gene Colan, and Jim Steranko.

Career
Kerry Gammill began working for Marvel Comics with his first published work, a Spider-Man/Daredevil story titled "A Fluttering of Wings Most Foul", appearing in Marvel Team-Up #73 (Sept. 1978). During his time in the comics industry, he illustrated such series as Power Man and Iron Fist, Superman vol. 2, and Action Comics. He collaborated with writer J. M. DeMatteis on the creation of Frog-Man in Marvel Team-Up #121 (Sept. 1982) and featured the character in a storyline in Marvel Fanfare #32 (May 1987). Gammill co-created such other characters as Ariel, White Rabbit, Chance, Leila Davis, and Draaga. He drew the first two issues of the Deadly Foes of Spider-Man limited series in 1991 and in the following year, was one of the artists on the debut issue of Team Titans.

After leaving comics, Gammill became a special effects concept artist, character designer, and storyboard artist for movies, TV shows, and the gaming industry. Projects he worked on include Virus, Species II, Phantoms, The Outer Limits, and Tremors: The Series.

In 2001, Vanguard Productions published Kerry Gammill's Drawing Monsters and Heroes for Comics and Film, a how-to book containing art from Gammill's comics, kids' promotions, and creature design for movies and TV. Gammill later co-authored another book for Vanguard on the art of Basil Gogos. In 2020, Gammill served as art director on Legendary Comics' adaptation of Bram Stoker's 1897 Dracula novel, which used the likeness of Bela Lugosi, the lead actor in the 1931 film from Universal Pictures.

Personal life
Gammill has been married to Susan Gammill since 1975. They have three children, a son, Jeff, born in 1980, another son, Steve, born in 1983 and a daughter, Kathryn born in 1992. He also has three grandchildren, Piper, Brielle and Madelyn. Gammill lives in Fort Worth, Texas.

Bibliography

Absolute Comics
 Action Packed Tales of the Dallas Fantasy Fair #1 (two pages) (1994)

Adhesive Comics
 Too Much Coffee Man #5 (one page) (1996)

DC Comics

 Action Comics #606 (cover only); #647–652, 655, 657 (1989–1990)  
 Adventures of Superman Annual #2 (1990)
 Elvira's House of Mystery #8 (1986)  
 Hawk and Dove Annual #2 (1991)  
 The New Teen Titans vol. 2 #26–27 (1986–1987)  
 The New Titans #80 (1991) 
 Power Girl #1–4 (covers only) (1988) 
 Superman vol. 2 #24–28, 30, 32–35, 39, 50, 52 (1988–1991) 
 Superman For Earth #1 (1991)  
 Superman: The Man of Steel #15 (1992)  
 Superman: The Wedding Album #1 (1996)  
 Superman: Under a Yellow Sun #1 (1994)  
 Team Titans #1 (1992) 
 Who's Who in the DC Universe #1, 3, 5, 14, 16 (1990–1992)
 Who's Who in the Legion of Super-Heroes #6–7 (1988)
 Who's Who: The Definitive Directory of the DC Universe #11 (1986)
 Who's Who: Update '87 #5 (1987)

IDW Publishing
 The Chilling Archives of Horror Comics! #24 (text article) (2018)

Legendary Comics
 Bram Stoker's Dracula Starring Bela Lugosi GN (2020)

Marvel Comics

 Cable vol. 2 #3 (1993)  
 Deadly Foes of Spider-Man #1–2 (1991)  
 Doctor Strange vol. 2 #46 (1981)  
 Double Edge: Alpha #1 (1995) 
 Fallen Angels #1–2, 4, 7 (1987)
 Fantastic Four #266, 296 (1984–1986)  
 The Further Adventures of Indiana Jones #7–8, 11–12 (1983)
 Marvel Fanfare #19 (Cloak and Dagger); #31–32 (Captain America); #48 (She-Hulk) (1985–1989) 
 Marvel Team-Up #73, 119–125, 127–129, 131 (1978–1983)
 Power Man and Iron Fist #61–68, 70–72, 74–75, 77–79 (1980–1982)
 Savage Sword of Conan #58 (1980)
 The Spectacular Spider-Man Annual #4 (1984) 
 Star Wars #70, #102, #108 (1983–1986, 2019)
 Uncanny X-Men #223 (1987)  
 What If...? vol. 2 #80 (1995)  
 Wonder Man #1 (1986)  
 X-Factor Annual #9 (1994)

Nate Butler Studio, Inc.
 Aida-Zee #1 (1990)

The S. F. C. A.
 Rocket's Blast Comicollector #123 (1975)

References

External links 
 
 
 
 Kerry Gammill at Mike's Amazing World of Comics
 Kerry Gammill at the Unofficial Handbook of Marvel Comics Creators

1954 births
20th-century American artists
21st-century American artists
American comics artists
American storyboard artists
American video game designers
Artists from Texas
DC Comics people
Living people
Marvel Comics people
People from Fort Worth, Texas